Im Haarknoten wohnt eine Dame is a book by Nobel Prize-winning author Herta Müller. It was first published in 2000. Like many of Müller's books it focuses on Romanian-Germans and their past involvement with Nazism.

References 

2000 German novels
Works by Herta Müller
German-language novels